Everus (Li Nian) is a car marque of Guangqi Honda, a joint venture between Honda and Guangzhou Automobile Group (GAC Group). Honda became the first foreign automaker to develop vehicles under a brand owned by its local joint venture automaker in China.  
Li Nian launched its first car, the S1 at the Shanghai Auto Show in April 2011.

Products

Everus S1
The S1 is the first Everus car available for sale. It is a rebadged fourth-generation Honda City saloon and went on sale in April 2011.

Everus VE-1
An electric subcompact CUV loosely based on Honda Vezel that was previewed by the Everus EV concept.

Concept cars
To announce the Everus marque in 2008, Li Nian, a compact SUV concept car was revealed at the Beijing International Automobile Exhibition Auto China.

The Li Nian Roadster concept was shown by Guangqi Honda in 2009 Shanghai Auto Show.

The Li Nian Sedan concept was debuted at Auto China 2010 in Beijing.

The EV SUV concept was debuted at Auto China 2018 in Beijing.

References

Vehicle manufacturing companies established in 2008
Honda
Motor vehicle manufacturers of China
Chinese brands